The Diocese of Mananjary is a Roman Catholic Diocese under the Archdiocese of Fianarantsoa in Madagascar. It is based in the town of Mananjary and was erected on 9 April 1968. It performs the Latin Rite. The Diocese covers approximately 14,270 km (5,511 sq. miles). As of 2004, the diocese population was about 700,000, with 14.8% Catholic. 35 priests were in the Diocese for a ratio of 2,962 Catholics for every 1 Priest. José Alfredo Caires de Nobrega, SCI has been the bishop of the Diocese since October 2000.

Ordinaries
Robert Lucien Chapuis, M.E.P. (9 Apr 1968 - 29 Dec 1973)
François Xavier Tabao Manjarimanana, S.J. (20 Nov 1975 - 24 May 1999)
José Alfredo Caires de Nobrega, S.C.I. (30 Oct 2000 - )

External links
 Profile of Mananjary Diocese

Roman Catholic dioceses in Madagascar
1968 establishments in Madagascar
Roman Catholic Ecclesiastical Province of Fianarantsoa